Sophie Deraspe (born October 27, 1973) is a Canadian director, scenarist, director of photography and producer. Prominent in new Quebec cinema, she is known for a 2015 documentary The Amina Profile, an exploration of the Amina Abdallah Arraf al Omari hoax of 2011. She had previously written and directed the narrative feature films Missing Victor Pellerin in 2006, Vital Signs in 2009, The Wolves in 2015,

In 2019 she wrote, directed and shot Antigone, inspired by the 2008 death of Fredy Villanueva in Montreal and loosely adapting the play by Sophocles, saying the story of a woman who defies the law for something greater resonated with her, and she wished to update it. The film, starring Nahéma Ricci, premiered at the 2019 Toronto International Film Festival and won the festival's award for Best Canadian Film.
Antigone was chosen to represent Canada in the 2019 Oscars race.

Nominated in 15 categories, her first TV series Dark Soul (Bête noire) won four Gémeaux Awards in 2021, including Best TV Drama Series and Best Director (Drama series). The USA, Australia, France and Norway bought the broadcasting rights and more countries will be added. Her latest TV series, Paradise Motel (Motel Paradis), will be broadcast in 2022.

Deraspe characterizes her work, which often deals with contemporary art, as "constantly questioning limits, particularly those related to representation, as well as the boundaries of reality and fiction."

Sophie Deraspe has been invited to join the Academy of Motion Picture Arts and Sciences (AMPAS) in 2020. In 2021 she has received the title .

Biography 
After studying visual arts in Austria, Sophie Deraspe majored in French literature and then film studies at the Université de Montréal from 1995 to 1998. After graduating with a B.A., she worked as a trainee in the directing department on such seminal Quebec feature films as Philippe Falardeau's debut feature  (The Left-Hand Side of the Fridge, 2000) and André Turpin's  (Soft-Shell Man, 2001), and served as director of photography on numerous film and television productions. In 2001 she joined the board of directors of Vidéographe, a Montreal-based artist-run center, serving as chairperson from 2007 to 2008. Also in 2001, her documentary short film  was selected for official competition at the Festival du film francophone de Namur (Belgium). , her fiction short, screened at festivals around the world, winning two prizes.

Missing Victor Pellerin (2006) 
In 2006 Deraspe finished her first independent feature, Missing Victor Pellerin (Recherche Victor Pellerin) — about a mysterious painter who has disappeared — which was screened at the Museum of Modern Art (New York) and in some twenty national and international festivals. At home, it was the opening night film at the Rendez-vous du cinéma québécois in Québec city – and later at the Quebec Film Week in San Francisco. The film received national distribution in Canada and screened theatrically in New York in 2007, and received a Special Jury Mention (International competition) at the Festival du nouveau cinéma in Montréal.

According to critic Marcel Jean, now director of Cinémathèque québécoise, in the magazine 24 images (no 129), says this about the film: "(...) Both screenwriters, editor, camerawoman and interpreter of Missing Victor Pellerin, Sophie Deraspe plunges completely in this first destabilizing feature film whose discourse - with a non-insignificant resonance - essentially poses the question of appearances. The world is presented as a vast hoax in which the gesture of Victor Pellerin appears scandalous in that it lifts the veil on a corner of this immense deception. The result is promising, too rare being the filmmakers who, from the start, reveal both a real ambition and the ability to make you smile."

Several other critics go to show their positive appreciation: "Is Montrealer Sophie Deraspe's astonishing first film a documentary, mockumentary, cinematic installation piece, true cinema, performance workout, full-on fiction or flat-out hoax? Only one thing is obvious: it is a mind game of museum-worthy proportions." (John Griffin, The Gazette); "A little gem of astonishing ingenuity" (Manon Dumais, Voir); "Without contest, one of the Quebec originals of the year" (Annabelle Nicoud, La Presse); "An uncanny, uncategorizable film... comic yet human." (Charles Petersen, The Village Voice); "An enigmatic and utterly compelling story" (Jeannette Catsoulis, The New York Times).

Vital Signs (2009) 
In 2009 her second feature, Vital Signs (Les signes vitaux), premiered at the Festival of New Cinema (Montreal). It took the prize for Best New Canadian Film at the Whistler Film Festival (Canada), where the film's star, Marie-Hélène Bellavance, was named Best Actress for her debut performance. The film was also screened at the International Film Festival Rotterdam. Writing for The Montreal Gazette, John Griffin praised the film for "superb acting and cinematography." Vital Signs went on to win prizes at several 2010 festivals, including SXSW Film Festival (Austin, Texas); the Internationales Frauenfilmfestival (Cologne, Germany); Polar Lights International Arctic Film Festival (Murmansk, Russia); the Edinburgh International Film Festival and the Festival Internacional de Cine (Monterrey, Mexico); "A must see" (Guillame Fournier, VOIR). The film made the cover of the film magazine Ciné-Bulles (winter 2010) and was ranked fourth best film of 2010 by Ciné-Bulles film magazine. Vital Signs subsequently enjoyed a successful international career in festivals where it won more than 15 awards.

The Wolves (2015) 
2015 was particularly productive for Deraspe, who completed two feature films that year. The Wolves (Les Loups), a Canada-France co-production, brought together Quebec actors Evelyne Brochu, Louise Portal, Benoît Gouin, Gilbert Sicotte and newcomer Cindy-Mae Arsenault, a native of the Magdalen Islands, where the film was shot. The film depicts a young woman who arrives on an island during the spring thaw and sets out to become part of the community of islanders, who earn their livelihood from seal hunting. The Wolves was shown at the Whistler Film Festival, where Louise Portal's performance received a Special Mention, and at the Torino Film Festival in 2015, where the Fipresci jury named it Best Film. The Wolves was also released theatrically in Quebec.

A Gay Girl in Damascus (2015) 
A Gay Girl in Damascus: The Amina Profile (U.S. title) is the director's first feature-length documentary. After its world premiere at the 2015 Sundance Film Festival, the film was shown at numerous other festivals, winning awards for Best Documentary at TLVFest in Tel Aviv and GAZE in Dublin, Ireland, as well as the Grand Prize at Japan Prize in 2016, before IFC Films acquired the U.S. rights for distribution theatrically and on their digital platform docclub.com [archive]. La Presse gave it  stars, calling it "powerful, brilliant... extremely well constructed", while Variety praised its "slippery, deftly woven narrative.

The Seven Last Words (2019) 
For this 2019 multidisciplinary omnibus project, Sophie Deraspe joined six other directors — musician and composer Kaveh Nabatian, along with Ariane Lorrain, Sophie Goyette, Juan Andrés Arango, Karl Lemieux and Caroline Monnet — to produce a  septet of short films all themed on the sayings of Jesus on the cross.  Unified by the music of the Callino Quartet, the films were shot in Iran, Haiti, Colombia, Nunavut and Québec in 35mm, 16mm and HD while Marc Boucrot (of Gaspar Noe’s Enter the Void and Love) was the film's editor. Justine Smith wrote that Deraspe's short had "the greatest impact" of the seven short films.

Antigone (2019) 
A contemporary adaptation of the Sophocles play, Antigone, written, edited, and directed by Deraspe, revisited the myth in a story of a 16-year-old girl and three siblings who have immigrated to Montreal, Canada with their grandmother after the murder of their parents. When the police kill her older brother and the other brother is threatened with deportation, Antigone struggles to save what remains of her family.

She met with lawyers and investigators to become knowledgeable in the area. This would help her to be able to portray those scenes involving law enforcement with accuracy. At the 2019 Toronto International Film Festival it was named Best Canadian Feature Film and was chosen to represent Canada at the Academy Awards in contention for Best International Feature Film.

Dark Soul (2021) 
Produced by Encore Television for Corus Entertainment’s Séries Plus, the six-episode drama series Dark Soul (Bête noire) examines the consequences of a shooting carried out by 16-year-old Jérémy at his school, looking at what drove him to orchestrate such an act of hate and how his grieving family are left to pick up the pieces. With the help of psychiatrist coroner Éliane (Sophie Cadieux) leading the investigation into the case, Jérémy’s mother Mélanie (Isabelle Blais) will try to work out how her seemingly trouble-free son came to commit such a terrible crime. The series is notable for the fact it starts in the minutes after the fictional shooting, with viewers never explicitly seeing the events that are at the centre of the story. Nominated in 15 categories, her first TV series Bête Noire (2021) won four Gémeaux Awards, including Best TV Drama Series and Best Director (Drama series). The USA, Australia, France and Norway bought the broadcasting rights and more countries will be added.

Motel Paradise (in post-production) 
In her latest TV series, Motel Paradise, the viewers will follow the journey of Jen, who's, after having near-death experience, no longer believes in the hypothesis of suicide of her 14-year-old sister. Jen will try to convince a retired investigator to reopen the investigation. The series will be broadcast on Club illico in 2023.

Filmography

Director and scenarist

Feature films 

 2006: Missing Victor Pellerin (Rechercher Victor Pellerin)
 2009: Vital Signs (Les signes vitaux)
 2014: The Wolves (Les Loups)
 2015: The Amina Profile (documentary)
 2019: The Seven Last Words
 2019: Antigone

Television 

 2012:  (documentary)

Director

TV series 

 2021: Dark Soul (Bête noire)
 Motel Paradise (in post-production)

Director of photography

Feature Film 

 2006: Missing Victor Pellerin (Rechercher Victor Pellerin)
 2009: Vital Signs (Les signes vitaux)
 2014: The Wolves (Les Loups)
 2015: A Gay Girl in Damascus: The Amina Profile (documentary)
 2019: The Seven Last Words
 2019: Antigone

Short films 

 2000: 
 2007:

Actress

Film 

 2006: Missing Victor Pellerin

Television 

 2012:   (as herself)

Awards - TV series

Awards - Feature Films

Distinctions 

 2021 - Compagne des arts et des lettres du Québec
 2020 - Member of the Academy of Motion Picture Arts and Sciences (AMPAS)
 2015 - Birks Diamond Tribute to the Year’s Women in Film (TIFF)

See also
 List of female film and television directors
 List of LGBT-related films directed by women

Bibliography 
 DEQUEN, Bruno and Philippe GAJAN (dir.), thematic section titled Renouveau du cinéma québécois, 24 images, no 152, June–July 2011, pp. 4–34.
 DEQUEN, Bruno (organizer) et al., "Table ronde sur le renouveau du cinéma québécois," Nouvelles Vues, no 12 (spring-summer 2011).
 DERASPE, Sophie, "Les signes vitaux, entretien avec Sophie Deraspe," Ciné-Bulles, no 278, Montreal, January     2010.
 FARADJI, Helen, "Nouvelle vague 2.0?", 24 images, Premiers plans blog, February 26, 2009. 
 FARADJI, Helen, "Les cordonniers," 24 images, Premiers plans blog, November 4, 2010.
 SIROIS-TRAHAN, Jean-Pierre, "La mouvée et son dehors: renouveau du cinéma québécois," Cahiers du Cinéma, no     660, Paris, October 2010, pp. 76–78.

References

External links

1973 births
Canadian women film directors
Canadian documentary film directors
Canadian women screenwriters
People from Rivière-du-Loup
French Quebecers
Living people
Film directors from Quebec
Best Screenplay Genie and Canadian Screen Award winners
Best Editing Genie and Canadian Screen Award winners
Best Director Jutra and Iris Award winners
Canadian women documentary filmmakers